Schiffenensee or Lac de Schiffenen is an artificial lake formed by a barrage of the Saane/Sarine river in the canton of Fribourg, Switzerland. The barrages at Schiffenen, Düdingen municipality, were completed in 1963.

See also
List of lakes of Switzerland

References 

Schiffenen
Schiffenen
RSchiffenensee
Schiffenen